The rolling stock preserved on the Severn Valley Railway is used to operate trains on the Severn Valley Railway (SVR), a heritage railway in Shropshire and Worcestershire, England. There is a variety of preserved steam and diesel locomotives, diesel multiple units, passenger coaches, and goods wagons. Most of these are typical of Great Western Railway (GWR) or London Midland and Scottish Railway (LMS) branch lines. Some are owned by the railway itself but most are owned by various individuals or voluntary groups.

The line is also regularly visited by locomotives based elsewhere. Some come for a day on a railtour, others for a few days or weeks to take part in a special gala, for test running, or on short term hire. These visitors are not included in this article.

Rolling stock summary
The railway can call on a large fleet to operate its services. Only a small 'core' group of vehicles actually belong to the railway company itself; the remainder are owned by a associated groups, such as the Great Western (Severn Valley Railway) Association, or individuals. The SVR is also the base of the DMU Group (West Midlands), which focuses on DMU preservation. Locomotives and vehicles from the railway are now only infrequently used on excursions on the National Rail network, but in the past have operated across Great Britain.

Steam locomotives

Operational steam locomotives

Steam locomotives under overhaul, repair or restoration

Steam locomotives stored awaiting overhaul

Steam locomotives under construction

Steam locomotives on static display

Diesel locomotives

Mainline Diesel locomotives

Diesel shunters

Diesel multiple units

The SVR's BR Class 108 units comprise:
M50933: Driving Motor Brake Second (DMBS), built 1960;
M51941: DMBS, built 1960;
E52064: Driving Motor Composite with lavatory (DMCL), built 1961;
E56208: Driving Trailer Composite with lavatory (DTCL), built 1958, and;
NE59250: Trailer Brake Second with lavatory (TBSL), built 1958.

Carriages 
The SVR is home to around 70 passenger carriages, with those used in day to day service being of GWR, LMS, LNER, and British Railways Mark 1 origin.

Wagons 
The SVR is also home to more than 100 wagons, including many Great Western Railway wagons owned by the GWR 813 Preservation fund.

Past members of the SVR fleet
Locomotives formerly resident on the SVR and which saw regular service there include:

Steam Locomotives
 3205: GWR 2251 Class 0-6-0. Built 1946. First steam locomotive to arrive at SVR in 1967. Left the SVR in 1987.
 3717 City of Truro: GWR 3700 Class 4-4-0. Built in 1903. On loan from the NRM from July 1984; overhauled in time for mainline use during the 150th anniversary celebrations of the GWR in 1985. Returned to the NRM in June 1986.
 6960 Raveningham Hall: GWR 6959 Class Modified Hall 4-6-0. Built in 1944. Left in 1996, returned on hire between 2019 and 2021.
 34053 Sir Keith Park: SR Battle of Britain Class 4-6-2. Built in 1946. Arrived newly-restored in 2012. Returned to the Swanage Railway in January 2018.
 45000: LMS Stanier Class 5 4-6-0. Built in 1935. On loan from the NRM between 1977 and 1988.
 45690 Leander: LMS Jubilee Class 4-6-0. Built in 1936. Resident 1980–1981 (for overhaul) and 1983–1994. Classmate 45699 Galatea was also acquired with Leander but sold unrestored.
 46521: LMS Ivatt Class 2 2-6-0. Built in 1953. Featured as "Blossom" in the 1990s television sitcom Oh, Doctor Beeching!. Left the SVR in 2001.
 60009 Union of South Africa: LNER Class A4 4-6-2. Built in 1937. Left the SVR in 2007.
 61994 The Great Marquess: LNER Class K4 2-6-0. Built in 1937. Arrived in 1972; owned by SVR chairman Viscount Garnock. Left the SVR in 2005.
 70000 Britannia: BR Standard Class 7 4-6-2. Built in 1951. Restored at the SVR between 1971 and 1980, left in 1981.
 193 Shropshire: Hunslet Austerity 0-6-0ST. Built in 1953 for the War Department. Resident between 1971 and 1981; named "Shropshire" in 1977.

Diesel locomotives 
 D8059 (20059): BR Class 20 Bo-Bo. Arrived 2009, resident until 2017.
 D8188 (20188): BR Class 20 Bo-Bo Arrived 2007, resident until 2017.

The lists above are not intended to be a comprehensive record of every former resident and do not include the following:
 small industrial steam and diesel shunting locomotives used in the 1960s and early 1970s;
 locomotives which arrived at the SVR but left with restoration incomplete;
 locomotives which were acquired but scrapped as a source of parts;
 steam locomotives loaned to the SVR for static display, and;
 diesel locomotives loaned to the SVR primarily for non-passenger use.

References

Sources

External links 
Severn Valley Railway Locomotives on the official Severn Valley Railway website
SVR Charitable Trust owners of 7819 Hinton Manor and other rolling stock
Great Western (SVR) Association owners of 7325 and other rolling stock
LNER Coach Fund Joint website covering the SVR-based LNER coaches
The DMU Group (West Midlands) owners and operators of the DMU
GWR 813 Preservation Fund owners of GWR 813 and almost 100 ex-GWR wagons accommodated at a number of heritage railways including the SVR

Rail transport in Shropshire
Severn Valley
Severn Valley Railway